Theme from a Summer Place is a studio album released by Billy Vaughn in 1960 on Dot LP record DLP 3276 (mono) 25276 (stereo).  The album topped Billboard's album charts in 1960 for two weeks, and stayed in the charts for a total of 62 weeks.

Track listing

References

1960 albums
Billy Vaughn albums
Dot Records albums